Retina (or More Fun Than a Vat of Love) is a ten-track album by Scottish orchestral rock band How to Swim. Produced by Gavin Thomson and the band's own Ink Wilson, the record was released on 4 October 2010 through Personal Hygiene Records.

Guest musicians include saxophonist Tom Brogan from Glasgow band The Low Miffs as well as Kimberley Moore, vocalist with Zoey Van Goey, who takes lead vocals on the track "False".

The record is the first full-length How to Swim release to not be a compilation of earlier EPs or singles.

Track listing
 "Diego Whirlwind"  – 4:08
 "Inferiority"  – 3:20
 "High School Apocalypse"  – 4:00
 "From Here to Dundee Slash Eternity"  – 4:53
 "Genesis P and Me" – 4:24
 "False" – 4:41
 "The Ghastly Ones"  - 3:41
 "Activity.Anxiety.Trust"  - 3:11
 "Ink Wilson's World of Fear"  -  6:17
 "It's Alright"  - 3:34

Personnel 
 Ink Wilson - vocals, guitar
 Sean Callaghan - guitar
 Chris Brown - drums
 Paul Kelly - guitar, piano, keyboards
 Martin Docherty - bass
 Richard Merchant - trumpet
 Ross McCrae - trombone
 Hannah Rankine - saxophone
 Heather North - flute
 Nicola West - cello
 Annie MacFarlane - violin
 Anna Webster - vocals

References
 Review at www.list.co.uk
 Review at www.theskinny.co.uk

External links
 Retina (or More Fun Than a Vat of Love) at Last.fm

2010 albums
How to Swim (band) albums